Christin Elizabeth Cooper (born October 10, 1959) is a former World Cup alpine ski racer and Olympic medalist from the United States.

Early years
Born in Los Angeles, California, she was raised in Ketchum, Idaho, and learned to ski and race at neighboring Sun Valley. Cooper's stepfather was William C. "Bill" Janss (1918–96), owner of the Sun Valley Resort until 1977.
 
After her father William died of cancer in Los Angeles, her mother Glenn moved the family of five children to Ketchum in the late 1960s. At the request of longtime friends Bill and Anne Janss, owners of Sun Valley, Mrs. Cooper founded the arts center for the resort in 1969. Anne Janss died in an avalanche accident near the resort in early 1973; later that year Glenn Cooper and Bill Janss were married, with a combined family of eight children.

Racing career
As a member of the U.S. Ski Team, Cooper raced on the World Cup circuit from 1977-84. Starting the 1977 season on the "C" team, she made her World Cup debut at age 17 on January 19 and finished 14th in a slalom at Schruns, Austria; a week later she had a tenth-place finish in the slalom at Crans-Montana, Switzerland.  Best in the technical events, she raced in all five disciplines, with World Cup podiums in four.
She broke her ankle during training in August, prior to the 1978 season.
She competed in the slalom at the 1978 World Championships in Garmisch, West Germany, but did not finish. At the 1980 Winter Olympics in Lake Placid at age twenty, she was eighth in the slalom and seventh in the giant slalom at Whiteface Mountain.

Cooper's best season in international competition was in 1982, when she won three medals (two silvers and a bronze) at the World Championships at Haus im Ennstal, Austria.  She also had three World Cup victories and placed third in the 1982 World Cup overall standings.  The previous season, she finished fourth in the women's overall and second in slalom.

A downhill training crash in late January at Les Diablerets in Switzerland sidelined her for the remainder of the 1983 season. It resulted in a compression fracture in her left tibia just below the knee and required a bone graft from her hip. Cooper returned to form the following season with five early podiums before the 1984 Winter Olympics, and then won the silver medal in the Olympic giant slalom, 0.40 seconds behind teammate Debbie Armstrong at Jahorina. Soon after, a run at her hometown resort of Sun Valley was named in her honor: the run "Silver Fox" on Seattle Ridge was renamed "Christin's Silver."  Nearby on Seattle Ridge is "Gretchen's Gold," a run named after Gretchen Fraser, a gold medalist in the slalom at the 1948 Winter Olympics and a mentor to Cooper.

Cooper retired from international competition following the 1984 season, in which she was the runner-up in the season's giant slalom standings. She completed her racing career at age 24 with five World Cup victories, 26 podiums, and 68 top tens.

World Cup results

Season standings

Race podiums
5 victories - (1 GS, 2 SL, 2 K)
26 podiums - (1 SG, 10 GS, 9 SL, 6 K); 68 top tens

World championship results 

From 1948 through 1980, the Winter Olympics were also the World Championships for alpine skiing.At the World Championships from 1954 through 1980, the combined was a "paper race" using the results of the three events (DH, GS, SL).

Olympic results

Post-racing
Cooper has worked as a television broadcaster for CBS and NBC, covering alpine ski racing, including the 2010 Vancouver games.  She teamed with Tim Ryan, a fellow Ketchum resident, during the 1992, 1994, and 1998 Winter Olympics.  Christin and her husband, former U.S. Ski Team member Mark Taché (of Aspen, CO),
are co-founders of Montana Ale Works, a public house and restaurant in Bozeman, Montana.

2014 Winter Olympics
While covering the 2014 Winter Olympics in Sochi as a reporter on alpine skiing for NBC, Cooper was widely criticized for her interview with Bode Miller after his bronze medal win in the super G at Rosa Khutor. During the post-event interview on February 16, Miller became increasingly emotional. Cooper repeatedly questioned him about his late brother Chelone, who had died the previous April at the age of 29, until Miller broke down in tears and was unable to continue.

For her pressing of the issue, Cooper was accused of badgering Miller. Later that evening, Miller tweeted his fans should "be gentle" with Cooper, as it was "not at all her fault," and "she asked the questions every interviewer would have." The following morning on The Today Show, Miller reiterated his support for Cooper, saying, "I have known Christin a long time, and she's a sweetheart of a person. I know she didn't mean to push. I don't think she really anticipated what my reaction was going to be, and I think by the time she realized it, it was too late. I don't blame her at all."

The race and Cooper's interview were aired by NBC in prime time on U.S. television, more than fifteen hours after its midday completion in Russia. The network had ample time to exclude that uncomfortable segment, but chose not to.

Video

References

External links

Christin Cooper – 1977-84 World Cup standings at the International Ski Federation

Sports Illustrated - 1984 Winter Olympics - 20-Feb-1984

American female alpine skiers
Olympic silver medalists for the United States in alpine skiing
Alpine skiers at the 1980 Winter Olympics
Alpine skiers at the 1984 Winter Olympics
American sports announcers
People from Ketchum, Idaho
Sportspeople from Idaho
1959 births
Living people
Medalists at the 1984 Winter Olympics
21st-century American women
Olympic Games broadcasters
Skiing announcers